The Salonta City Hall is the headquarters of local government in Salonta, Bihor County, Romania. It is situated at 1 Republicii Street.

The building was constructed during the Austro-Hungarian period, between 1906 and 1907, in Art Nouveau style.

The building has three symmetrical façades, with a ground and upper floor. Overlooking the former market square is the prominent center section, located on a street corner. The main entrance is in this part, with an ornate balcony above.

There are large semicircular windows in all three directions, topped by a triangular roof gable. Among the gable decorations are the lion from the  coat of arms, and native János Arany holding his family arms. The interior features an ornate staircase and a richly decorated ballroom.

The building is listed as a historic monument by Romania's Ministry of Culture and Religious Affairs.

References

External links
 

Historic monuments in Bihor County
City and town halls in Romania
Government buildings completed in 1907
Art Nouveau architecture in Romania
Salonta